Akka is a female spirit in Sami shamanism, and Finnish and Estonian mythology. Her worship is common and took the forms of sacrifice, prayer and various other rituals. Some Sámi believe she lived under their tents. As with other gods, her name appears within some geographical names, leaving a legacy of Sami presence.

Sami mythology 
 Maderakka, the first akka, was mother of the tribe, goddess of women and children, she who gives humans their bodies. Women and girls belong to her, as do boys until they are declared men. Maderakka is popular among modern Sámi feminists. Her three daughters are:
 Sarakka, the goddess of fertility, menstruation, love, human sexuality, pregnancy and childbirth. After a birth, a woman would eat a special porridge dedicated to Sarakka. The modern Sámi women's organisation The Sarahkka formed in 1988 and is named in honor of her.
 Juksakka, "akka with an arrow", the protector of children.
 Uksakka, who shapes the fetus in the mother's womb and assigns humans their sexes.
 Jabme-Akka, "the akka of the dead", is a goddess of the underworld. She soothes the spirits of dead babies, but all other spirits dwell in sorrow. Her land of the dead is said to mirror the land of the living, where everything is opposite. So, the dead are buried with the essentials of living (e.g. knives) and anything that would make their afterlife better.

Finnish and Estonian mythologies
In Finnish mythology, Akka is the wife of Ukko and is the goddess of fertility. As they make love, thunder rolls. She can be seen as the female side of nature, Maaemonen "mother earth", whom Ukko fertilizes.

In Estonian mythology, she is known as Maa-Ema.

References

Estonian goddesses
Finnish goddesses
Sámi goddesses
Death goddesses
Underworld goddesses
Fertility goddesses
Female legendary creatures